The Charles P. Noyes Cottage (also known as the Fillebrown House) was a summer home of Saint Paul pharmacist, Charles P. Noyes, who came to St. Paul in 1868. The cottage is listed on the National Register of Historic Places.

Description and history 
A sign outside the cottage cites it as being a rare example of American Picturesque architecture, dating back to the late 19th century when White Bear Lake was a resort town with large colonnaded hotels and fine summer homes along the lake.

The house was owned by the Fillebrown family for most of its years as a residence, and was donated to the White Bear Lake Area
Historical Society in 1978. The house is open for tours and special events.

References

External links
Fillebrown House - White Bear Lake Area Historical Society

Historic house museums in Minnesota
Houses completed in 1879
Houses on the National Register of Historic Places in Minnesota
Museums in Ramsey County, Minnesota
Houses in Ramsey County, Minnesota
White Bear Lake, Minnesota
Victorian architecture in Minnesota
National Register of Historic Places in Ramsey County, Minnesota